Emad Mohammed Ridha (born 24 July 1982) is a coach and former Iraqi football striker, currently managing Iraq U20.

Club career
On 25 June 2007, Emad renewed his contract with Sepahan for another season in a deal thought to be worth in the region of $600,000.

International career 
Mohammed made his full international debut on 31 January 2000, against Lebanon in Beirut in a 0–0 draw.

Managerial career

Start with Al-Zawraa
Emad Mohammed started his managerial career with hometown club Al-Zawraa. He retired from his playing career mid-season in 2014 to take over from Jamal Ali. The young manager did well in the regular season, finishing second in group A, level on points with Al Jawiya. However, Al Zawra’a massively underperformed in the playoffs, finishing dead last in group 1. Al Zawra’a decided not to extend his contract for the following season.

Al Najaf
Emad took over 7 games into the next season from the resigning Ali Wahab. The team ended up finishing 7th in group B, easily avoiding relegation. Emad was rehired the following season, replacing his replacement, Hatif Shamran. Al Najaf finished in 9th place overall, with 49 points. The team was knocked out in the round of 16 of the Iraqi FA Cup due to the team forfeiting their match against Amanat Baghdad. Al Najaf chose not to renew his contract once again.

Naft Al Wasat
Emad was appointed as manager of Naft Al Wasat on February 5, 2018 to replace Adil Nima. Prior to that, he rejected working for Al Talaba, due to the poor administrative state. He was sacked 7 rounds before the end of the season. A picture on the internet went viral the day of his sacking, a conversation between him and Al Zawraa player Ali Rehema, agreeing to fix the match for the latter. The picture turned out to be a hoax.

Iraq U20
Emad was appointed as U20 manager on 7 May 2021. In the 2023 AFC U-20 Asian Cup, Iraq finished as runners-up and qualified for the 2023 FIFA U-20 World Cup.

Statistics

International goals
Scores and results list the Iraq' goal tally first.

Managerial statistics

Honours

Player

Country
2002 WAFF Champions
4th place in 2004 Athens Olympics
2005 West Asian Games Gold medallist.

Club
Iran's Premier Football League
Winner: 2
2009/10 with Sepahan
2011/12 with Sepahan
Asian Champions League
Runner Up (1): 2007 with Sepahan
Iraqi Premier League
Winner:3
1999 with Al-Zawra'a SC
2000 with Al-Zawra'a SC
2001 with Al-Zawra'a SC
Qatar Stars League
Winner:1
 2002 with Al-Gharafa Sports Club
 2010/2011 with Zamalek SC
Emir of Qatar Cup
Winner:1
2002 with Al-Gharafa Sports Club
Iraq FA Cup
Winner:3
1998 with Al-Zawra'a SC
1999 with Al-Zawra'a SC
2000 with Al-Zawra'a SC
Hazfi Cup
Winner: 1
2006/07 with Sepahan
Runner Up:1 
2011–2012 with Shahin Bushehr F.C.
Egypt Cup
Winner:1
 2011 with Zamalek SC

Manager
Iraq national under-20 football team
West Asian Federation U18 Championship 2021

Individual
Iraq Super League young player (1998–1999).
Top scorer of AFC Youth Championship 2000 (4 goals).
Runner-up top scorer of FIFA Club World Cup 2007 with Sepahan
Best scorer of Sepahan 2008-2009 (14 goals)
2009/10 Iran Pro League top goalscorer with 19 goals with Sepahan

See also
 List of men's footballers with 100 or more international caps

Notes

External links

1982 births
2004 AFC Asian Cup players
Footballers at the 2004 Summer Olympics
2009 FIFA Confederations Cup players
2011 AFC Asian Cup players
Association football forwards
Iraqi footballers
Iraq international footballers
Living people
Iraqi expatriate footballers
Olympic footballers of Iraq
Expatriate footballers in Iran
Foolad FC players
Al-Gharafa SC players
Al-Wakrah SC players
Sepahan S.C. footballers
Shahin Bushehr F.C. players
People from Karbala
Al-Zawraa SC players
Persian Gulf Pro League players
Qatar Stars League players
FIFA Century Club
Iraqi expatriate sportspeople in Egypt
Iraqi football managers
Al-Zawraa SC managers